The Wessex Formation is a fossil-rich English geological formation that dates from the Berriasian to Barremian stages (about 145–125 million years ago) of the Early Cretaceous. It forms part of the Wealden Group and underlies the younger Vectis Formation and overlies the Durlston Formation. The dominant lithology of this unit is mudstone with some interbedded sandstones. It is part of the strata of the Wessex Basin, exposed in both the Isle of Purbeck and the Isle of Wight. While the Purbeck sections are largely barren of vertebrate remains, the Isle of Wight sections are well known for producing the richest and most diverse fauna in Early Cretaceous Europe.

Nomenclatural History 
The Wessex Formation has historically alternately been called the "Variegated Marls And Sandstones", a name used by W. J. Arkell in his 1947 map of the Isle of Purbeck as well as the "Wealden Marls"  It was given its current formal name by Daley and Stewart in 1979

Stratigraphy and Lithology

Introduction 

The Wessex Formation forms part of the Wealden Group within the Wessex Basin, an area of subsidence since Permo-Triassic times. The basin is located along southern half of the Isle of Wight and Purbeck, extending offshore into the English Channel. The Wealden Group is also exposed significantly in the Weald Basin, which has a separate stratigraphic succession. The Wealden Group is not widely present elsewhere in Britain, as these areas were tectonic highs where little to no sediment deposition was taking place. The formation has limited exposure as it has been deeply buried beneath the subsequent Lower Greensand. Selbourne and Chalk Groups, as well as being very vulnerable to erosion. It has been exposed at the surface due to the creation of anticlinal structures as a distant effect of the formation of the Pyrenees as part of the Alpine Orogeny during the Paleogene. The major source rocks for the sediments were from the Cornubian Massif to the west, an upland region roughly equivalent to the extent of Cornwall and Devon, with occasional large dropstones transported in tree roots being found in Wealden sediments over 100 kilometres from where they originated.

The Wessex Formation in the Isle of Purbeck 
The exposure in of the Wessex Formation in the Isle of Purbeck is largely confined to a thin belt on the south side of the Purbeck Ridge and is best exposed at Swanage, Lulworth Cove and Worbarrow Bay. One notable persistent horizon within the Purbeck sections of the formation is the "Coarse Quartz Grit", an up to 6 metre thick sequence of conglomeratic ironstone, with many beds including numerous centimetre sized subangular to rounded pebbles predominantly of vein derived quartz, hence the name. This horizon is present throughout the Purbeck outcrops of the Wessex Formation.

The Wessex Formation of the Isle of Wight 

The Isle of Wight succession has two primary exposures, The major one being the several kilometre long section along the South West coastline around Brighstone Bay, and another smaller exposure on the South East coast near Yaverland. While the formation taken as a whole dates from the Berriasian to the Barremian, only the uppermost part of the formation is exposed on the Isle of Wight. With less than 200 metres of exposed composite stratigraphic thickness, and which dates from latest Hauterivian to Barremian. The boundary between the two ages lies near the Pine Raft horizon. This makes the formation coeval with upper portion of the Weald Clay in the Weald Basin. The primary lithology of the exposed portion of the formation on the Isle of Wight consists of featureless purple-red overbank mudstone, interbedded with sandstones. The environment of deposition was a floodplain within a narrow, east-west oriented valley. The climate at the time of deposition is considered to be semi-arid, based on the presence of pedogenic calcrete nodules within the mudstones.  The aforementioned "Pine Raft" horizon found near the base of the exposed portion of the formation includes calcitized conifer trunks up to metre in diameter and 2–3 metres long.

Plant Debris Beds 

A notable feature of the formation are the so-called "Plant debris beds". These consist of a basal matrix supported conglomerate, grading upwards into grey mudstone with lignitic plant debris, including large trunk fragments of the extinct conifer Pseudofrenelopsis present in the upper portion. These were formed by sheet flood deposits induced by storms that filled pre-existing topographic lows like oxbow lakes and abandoned channels in the floodplain depositional environment. The debris beds do not form a continuous horizon throughout the formation, but are laterally extensive over tens of metres. Many of the wood fragments in the debris beds are cemented together with large nodules of pyrite, suggesting depositional conditions were anoxic. Most fossils within the formation are associated with the debris beds. Vertebrate fossils are mostly disarticulated individual bones and teeth, suggesting a long subaerial exposure prior to burial, though the bones lack abrasion, suggesting that they had not been significantly transported. Partial skeletons also sometimes occur, but are uncommon. Autochthonous siderite nodules are also present, which encase some of the fossils. Plant debris beds also exist within the Swanage section, but are noticeably sparse in fossils.

"Hypsilophodon bed" 
While most fossils are associated with the plant debris beds, a notable exception is the "Hypsilophodon bed" present near the top of the formation, an up to 1 metre thick bed of silty red-green mudstone, with two separate horizons that have produced almost exclusively over a hundred complete and articulated skeletons of the dinosaur Hypsilophodon, sometimes even with preserved tail tendons. The bed is laterally extensive, being persistent for over a kilometre. It has been recently suggested that the accumulation of skeletons were a mass mortality event caused by a crevasse splay. Just above the "Hypsilophodon bed" the red mudstones of the Wessex Formation change to the transitional light coloured sandstone "White rock" and overlying laminated grey mudstones of the Vectis Formation, caused by the changing of environmental conditions from that of a floodplain to coastal lagoon conditions, initiated by the early Aptian marine transgression. The transition to the Vectis Formation is also present in Swanage but thins out and disappears westward, having an erosive unconformity with the Lower Greensand Group or the Gault in these areas, often with a basal pebble bed.

Palaeoenvironment 
The palaeoenvironment of the Wessex Formation is considered to have been semi-arid, and has variously been compared to chaparral or macchia Mediterranean shrubland. The dominant trees were conifers of the extinct family Cheirolepidiaceae belonging to the genera Pseudofrenelopsis and Watsoniocladus, both of which have reduced xerophytic leaves adapted to arid conditions. Tree cover is thought to have been thin, and concentrated near waterways. The ground cover is thought to have consisted of xerophytic ferns.

Fauna

Invertebrates
Invertebrates are commonly preserved in the Wessex Formation. Freshwater bivalves can be found including unionids such as Margaritifera, Nippononaia, and Unio. These bivalves are helpful in reconstructing what the freshwater paleoenvironment may have been like during the formation's deposition. Specimens of Viviparus, a genus of freshwater snail, have also been found. While compression fossils of insects are found in the overlying Vectis Formation, all insect fossils in the Wessex formation are found as inclusions in amber. Amber can be found present as a rare component in plant debris beds in the Wessex formation both on the Isle of Wight and the Isle of Purbeck, however the only significant concentration and where all of the inclusions have been found is a lag channel in the L6 plant debris horizon just south-east of Chilton Chine. Only four species from the amber have been formally described, Cretamygale chasei a mygalomorph spider, Dungeyella gavini Libanodiamesa simpsoni, both chironomid midges, as well as Embolemopsis maryannae, a embolemid parasitic wasp. However a table of undescribed taxa has been given, and several images of some of the undescribed taxa have been released from various sources, including multiple chironomids, and a therevid dipteran.

Arthropods

Cartilaginous fishes

Ray-finned fish

Lissamphibians

Squamates

Turtles

Neosuchians

Plesiosaurs

Mammals

Pterosaurs

Dinosaurs

Ornithischians

Sauropods

Theropods

Flora

Spermatophytes

Pteridophytes

See also

 List of fossil sites
 List of stratigraphic units with dinosaur body fossils
 Dinosaurs of the Isle of Wight

References

 Batten, D. J. (ed.) 2011. English Wealden Fossils. The Palaeontological Association, London.

External links
 Discovery of shark teeth

Lower Cretaceous Series of Europe
Barremian Stage
Cretaceous England